Joyce Meadows, born Joyce Johanna Burger (born April 13, 1933) is a Canadian-American film and television actress.

Life and career 
Meadows was born in Arrowwood, Alberta, moving with her family to Montana and then California. She worked as a singer while in high school, and was a winner of the Miss Sacramento pageant, after which she moved to Hollywood, California. She studied acting there under Jeff Corey, earning her scholarship to the Pasadena Playhouse. Meadows moved to Los Angeles, California, where she began her screen career in the 1956 film Flesh and the Spur.

Meadows guest-starred in numerous television programs, including Bachelor Father, 77 Sunset Strip, Harbor Command, Perry Mason, Alfred Hitchcock Presents, Wagon Train, Tales of Wells Fargo, The Restless Gun, Highway Patrol, Wanted: Dead or Alive, The Millionaire, Kraft Suspense Theatre, The Man and the Challenge, and Maverick. She also starred in the short-lived television series Two Faces West. Meadows also appeared in films such as The Brain from Planet Arous, Frontier Gun, The Girl in Lovers Lane, Walk Tall and Zebra in the Kitchen. She retired in 1995.

References

External links 

Rotten Tomatoes profile

1933 births
Living people
Actresses from Alberta
Canadian emigrants to the United States
American film actresses
American television actresses
Canadian film actresses
Canadian television actresses
20th-century American actresses
20th-century Canadian actresses
21st-century American women